August 1 Declaration is a declaration made by the Chinese Communist Party under the Seventh World Congress of the Comintern. On August 1, 1935, during the Long March, the Chinese Communist Party Central Committee made public the “Message to all Compatriots on Resistance against Japanese and National Salvation”, – a well-publicized declaration calling upon the nation to organize a National United Front for resistance against Japan.

The declaration called upon the Chinese Nationalist Party to end the Chinese Civil War and to unite the “people” in resisting the Japanese invasion. It was one of the first steps to reorganize the Second United Front, which was not declared until 1937, when the Xi'an Incident and the outbreak of the Second Sino-Japanese War forced the Nationalists to work together with the Communist Party.

It also put forth the proposition that the people throughout the country, irrespective of whichever class or party, should unite and organize a “National Defense Government” and “Anti-Japanese Allied Forces for National Salvation”.

See also
Chinese Soviet Republic
Wang Ming
Comintern

References 
Lau Yee-Fui, Ho Wan-Yee & Yeung Sai-Cheung: "Glossary of Chinese Political Phrases". Union Research Institute. Hong Kong: 1977 (pp. 10–11)

External links 
 

Chinese Civil War
Comintern
1935 in China
History of the Chinese Communist Party
1935 documents